Egypt contains many lakes currently and other lakes that have vanished.

Current lakes

Lake Nasser

A vast reservoir in southern Egypt and northern Sudan created by the damming of the Nile after the construction of the High Dam of Aswan.

Manzala Lake 
Salt or brackish water lake.
In northeastern Egypt on the Nile Delta near Port Said, Damietta, Dakahlyia and Sharqyia governorates.

Maryut Lake
A salt lake in northern Egypt, between Alexandria and Al-Buhira (Beheira actually is named after it) Governorates.

Lake Bardawil
Salt water Lake in North Sinai Governorate.
It is said that it is named after King Baldwin I of Jerusalem of the First Crusade and that he was buried there.

Lake Moeris or Qaroun Lake 
Brackish water Lake.
South River Nile Delta in Fayoum Governorate.

Wadi Elrayan Lakes 
Brackish water Lake.
In Fayoum Governorate

Edko Lake 
Salt water lake in Al Bouhaira Governorate

Toshka Lakes
River water Lake.
In South Western Part of Egypt.

Great Bitter Lake or al-Buhayrat al-Murrah 
A salt water lake between the north and south part of the Suez Canal, includes Greater Bitter Lake and Lesser Bitter Lakes and el-Temmsah Lake (The crocodile lake).
In Ismailia Governorate.

Borolus Lake or Paralos lake 
Salt water Lake in North shore of River Nile Delta, Western corner in Kafr el-Sheikh Governorate.

Wadi El Natrun Lakes 
Salt alkaline water lakes (Contain Natron Salt)  in Wadi Natron area near el-Qattara Depression in Matruh Governorate.

Salt lakes of Siwa 
In Matrouh Governorate, Siwa Oasis in Western Desert.

References

External links 
 
 Historic Photos of Egyptian Lakes from The New York Public Library Digital Library.

 
Egypt
Lakes